The Cucurbiteae are a tribe of the subfamily Cucurbitoideae, which is part of the flowering plant family Cucurbitaceae (gourds). Species are usually monoecious herbaceous annuals or woody lianas.

The tribe consists of 13 genera reported, but a 2011 study based on genetics reported 11. Members of the genus Cucurbita produce economically valuable fruits, namely squashes and pumpkins.

Genera
The genera are:
 Abobra – cranberry gourd
 Calycophysum
 Cayaponia, the largest of these genera
 Selysia (placed under Cayaponia in the 2011 study)
 Cionosicys
 Cucurbita – squashes and pumpkins
 Penelopeia
 Anacaona (placed under Penelopeia in the 2011 study)
 Peponopsis
 Polyclathra
 Schizocarpum
 Sicana – cassabananas
 Tecunumania

References

Cucurbitoideae
Rosid tribes